Beeches, Fagus species, are used as food plants by the larvae of a number of Lepidoptera species including:

 Bucculatricidae
 Bucculatrix packardella
 Coleophoridae
 Coleophora albovanescens
 Coleophora currucipennella - recorded on F. crenata
 Drepanidae
 Oak hook-tip (Drepana binaria)
 Geometridae
 Common wave (Cabera exanthemata)
 Dotted border (Agriopis marginaria)
 Feathered thorn (Colotois pennaria)
 Large emerald (Geometra papilionaria)
 Light emerald (Campaea margaritata)
 Mottled umber (Erannis defoliaria)
 Pale November moth (Epirrita christyi)
 Winter moth (Operophtera brumata)
 Hepialidae
 Ghost moth (Hepialus humuli)
 Lymantriidae
 Brown-tail (Euproctis chrysorrhoea)
 Noctuidae
 Miller (Acronicta leporina)
 Notodontidae
 Rough prominent (Nadata gibbosa)
 Nymphalidae
 American white admiral/red-spotted purple (Limenitis arthemis) - recorded on American beech (F. grandifolia)
 Saturniidae
 Emperor moth (Pavonia pavonia)
 Io moth (Automeris io)
 Sphingidae
 Walnut sphinx (Amorpha juglandis)

External links

Beech
+Lepidoptera